Batman is a horizontally scrolling beat 'em up arcade game released by Atari Games, Midway Games, Data East and Namco in 1990 in North America, 1991 in Japan and 1991 in Europe. The storyline is based on the eponymous 1989 movie. It features stages based on locations in the film, including first-person control of the Batmobile and the Batwing. The game features audio clips of Batman (Michael Keaton) and the Joker (Jack Nicholson) as well as digitized photos from the movie.

Batman can use various weapons, such as batarangs and gas grenades, as he takes on various goons and the Joker.

Konami was also in talks of releasing an arcade game based on the 1989 film around the same time as Atari but "other companies got in the way". It is suspected that company was Atari.

See also
List of Batman video games

References

External links

Batman at Arcade History

1990 video games
Video games based on Batman films
Arcade video games
Atari arcade games
Batman (1989 film series)
Beat 'em ups
Data East arcade games
Data East video games
Midway video games
Namco arcade games
Side-scrolling beat 'em ups
Superhero video games
Video games based on adaptations
Video games based on films
Video games based on works by Tim Burton
Video games set in the United States